In enzymology, a glycosphingolipid deacylase is an enzyme that catalyzes a chemical reaction that cleaves gangliosides and neutral glycosphingolipids, releasing fatty acids to form the lyso-derivatives.

This enzyme belongs to the family of hydrolases, specifically those acting on carbon-nitrogen bonds other than peptide bonds, specifically in linear amides.  The systematic name of this enzyme class is glycosphingolipid amidohydrolase. This enzyme is also called glycosphingolipid ceramide deacylase.

References 

 

EC 3.5.1
Enzymes of unknown structure